Jannatul Ferdous, Ferdus or Ferdoush  is the name of:

Jannatul Ferdus (born 1999), Bangladeshi female cricketer
Jannatul Ferdoush Peya (born 1991), Bangladeshi model and actress
Jannatul Ferdous, first Bangladeshi female paratrooper
Jannatul Ferdous Misty, Bangladeshi film actress best known as Misty Jannat